The Deus Vayanne is an electric hyper/sports car produced by the Austrian car manufacturer DEUS Automobiles, the production will be limited to 99 units and will go into production in 2025.

Overview
The Vayanne was presented at the New York International Auto Show in April 2022. It was developed in collaboration with Italdesign and Advanced Engineering, a subsidiary of Williams Grand Prix Engineering and produced in Turin, Italy, at the premises of Italdesign.

The Austria-based company, together with its technical partners Italdesign Giugiaro and Williams Advanced Engineering, claims the Vayanne will be able to hit 100 kmh (62 mph) in under 1.99 seconds and will achieve a top speed of over 400 kmh (248 mph).

References

Cars of Austria
Cars introduced in 2022
Electric sports cars